Les Patrons Cuisiniers is a culinary association of quality restaurants in the Netherlands.

The partnership was established on 14 October 1991. It came into existence due to the founders being unhappy with the direction of older culinary partnerships. They also wanted more attention for the “White Brigade” (kitchen crew) instead of ownership. Membership is open for head chefs with proven culinary quality. Hence all members have Michelin stars awarded to them.

Chairperson of “Les Patron Cuiseniers” is former chef Cees Helder, who had been rewarded ‘’’three’’’ Michelin stars while cooking at restaurant Parkheuvel.

Founding Members
 Maartje Boudeling (former head chef Inter Scaldes)
 Paul Fagel
 Constant Fonk (De Oude Rosmolen)
 John Halvemaan
 Cees Helder (Parkheuvel)
 Toine Hermsen
 John Kern (Hooge Heerlijkheid, Middelharnis)
 Emmanuel Mertens (L'Auberge)
 Henk Savelberg

Present members

References

Restaurants in the Netherlands
Gastronomical societies
Dutch cuisine